Piotr Eberhardt (December 27, 1935 – September 10, 2020) was a Polish geographer, a professor at the Polish Academy of Science and author of studies in the field of demography and population geography. His works included the ethnic problems of Central and Eastern Europe in the 20th century. He also specialized in the field of geopolitics.

Biography 
Eberhardt was born in Warsaw, Poland. From the 1960s onwards, he was associated with the Institute of Geography and Spatial Organization of the Polish Academy of Science, where in 1968 he earned his doctorate, and in 1976 habilitation. The title of professor of earth science was bestowed upon him in 1994. Since 1983 he taught at the John Paul II Catholic University of Lublin.

Works 
 Rozmieszczenie i dynamika ludności wiejskiej w Europie Środkowo-Wschodniej w XX wieku, Warszawa 1991
 Polska granica wschodnia 1939-1945, Warszawa 1992
 Przemiany narodowościowe na Ukrainie XX wieku, Warszawa 1994
Przemiany narodowościowe na Białorusi, Warszawa 1994
Między Rosją a Niemcami. Przemiany narodowościowe w Europie Środkowo-Wschodniej w XX wieku, Warszawa 1996
Przemiany narodowościowe na Litwie, Warszawa 1998
Polska ludność kresowa. Rodowód, liczebność, rozmieszczenie, Warszawa 1998
Geografia ludności Rosji, Warszawa 2002
Ethnic Groups and Population Changes in Twentieth-Century Central-Eastern Europe. History, Data and Analysis, New York, London 2003
Polska i jej granice. Z historii polskiej geografii politycznej, Lublin 2004
Przemiany demograficzno-etniczne na obszarze Jugosławii w XX wieku, Lublin 2005
Twórcy polskiej geopolityki, Kraków 2006
Political Migrations on Polish Territories 1939-1950, Warsaw 2006

Awards
1994: prize of Przegląd Wschodni quarterly for scientific achievements related to the problems of Eastern Europe 
2002: Stanisław Staszic Award from the Polish Academy of Science
2004: Prime Minister of Poland state prize for outstanding scientific achievements
2009: Zygmunt Gloger Prize and medal.

References 

1935 births
2020 deaths
Polish geographers
Academic staff of the John Paul II Catholic University of Lublin